The 2020–21 Minnesota Golden Gophers men's basketball team represented the University of Minnesota in the 2020–21 NCAA Division I men's basketball season. The Gophers were led by eighth-year head coach Richard Pitino and played their home games at Williams Arena in Minneapolis, Minnesota as members of the Big Ten Conference. The Gophers finished the season 14–15, 6–14 in Big Ten play to finish in 13th place. They defeated Northwestern in the first round of the Big Ten tournament before losing to Ohio State in the second round. 

Following the season, the school fired Richard Pitino after eight years at the school. On March 23, 2021, the school named Minnesota alum and former Minnesota assistant coach Ben Johnson the new head coach.

Previous season
The Gophers finished the 2019–20 season 15–16, 8–12 in Big Ten play to finish in 12th place. The Gophers defeated Northwestern in the first round of the Big Ten tournament before the tournament was canceled due to the ongoing COVID-19 pandemic. All other postseason tournaments including the NCAA tournament were later canceled effectively ending the season.

Offseason

Departures

Incoming transfers

Recruiting classes

2020 recruiting class

2021 recruiting class

Roster

Schedule and results

|-
! colspan=9 style=|Regular season

  

|-
! colspan="9" style=|Big Ten tournament

Rankings

*AP does not release post-NCAA Tournament rankings^Coaches did not release a Week 1 poll.

References

2020-21
Minnesota
2020 in sports in Minnesota